Agadez, the Music and the Rebellion is a 2010 Nigerien documentary musical drama film directed by Ron Wyman and produced by Wyman and Van McLeod for Zero Gravity Films. The film features Omara "Bombino" Moctar, Jeremy Keenan, Thomas Seligman, and Mohamed Serge. The film is about Bombino, a young musician who has become a cult hero in Niger started to connect Tuareg nomads' new generation.

The film premiered on 14 October 2010 at the New Hampshire Film Festival.

References

External links 
 

Nigerien documentary films
2010 films
2010 documentary films
Desert blues
2010s English-language films